Nicolepeira is a genus of South American orb-weaver spiders first described by Herbert Walter Levi in 2001.  it contains only three species, all found in Chile.

References

Araneidae
Araneomorphae genera
Spiders of South America
Endemic fauna of Chile